Powelton Village  is a neighborhood of mostly Victorian, mostly twin homes in the West Philadelphia section of the United States city of Philadelphia, Pennsylvania.  It is a national historic district that is part of University City.  It extends north from Market Street to Spring Garden Street, east to 32nd Street, west to 40th and Spring Garden Streets, and to 44th and Market Streets.

History
Powelton Village takes its name from the Powel Family, seventeenth- and eighteenth-century Welsh colonialists who held extensive estates in the area. Samuel Powel served as mayor of Philadelphia from 1775 to 1776 and again from 1789 to 1790.  As in other parts of West Philadelphia, in the late 1800s trolley lines opened the area up to urbanization. Powelton soon became a choice residential spot for Philadelphia industrial tycoons. Powelton's luster began to wane by the 1920s, and by the 1940s the neighborhood was populated by low-income families and infested with "bottom" gangs, whose members lived in a stretch paralleling Market St. known as the "Bottom." In the 1960s the Village was home to many members of the counterculture movement, and Powelton today enjoys a strong political activism and anarchist tradition, as well as a healthy multiethnic pluralism.

In addition to the Powelton Historic District, the Bell Telephone Exchange Building, The Powelton, Frederick A. Poth Houses, and John Shedwick Development Houses are listed on the National Register of Historic Places.

The Neighborhood

Commercial activity in Powelton is concentrated on Lancaster Avenue, particularly between 35th Street and 37th Street. The avenue is lined with shops, restaurants, and various other retail establishments. Many local businesses benefit from both Powelton residents and college students.

Residential streets are mostly lined with Victorian twin houses, some of which are traditional family homes, while others have been subdivided into apartments. Detached houses, row houses, and apartment buildings also dot the neighborhood.

The southern end of Powelton Village includes property owned by Drexel University. Many students from Drexel live off-campus in Powelton's urban-structured row-house apartments because of the short walk to campus.

Transportation
Powelton is easily accessed by automobile and public transportation.  The neighborhood is close to Interstate 76, and several major streets, including Market, Spring Garden, and 34th, cross the neighborhood.  Bike lanes run along Haverford Avenue, Spring Garden Street and its bridge, Lancaster Avenue, and on 38th and 34th Streets south of Lancaster.

The neighborhood is close to two subway stops on the Market-Frankford Line, located at 34th and Market and 40th and Market.  Powelton is also easily accessed by trolley:  the route 10 trolley runs on 36th Street between the Ludlow Street portal and Lancaster Avenue, continuing west on Lancaster Avenue. Additionally, there are two underground trolley stops close to Powelton: 33rd and Market, serving all trolley lines, and 36th and Sansom, serving all lines except route 10. Bus route 31 runs through the neighborhood, traveling north on 33rd, Baring, and 35th, and south on 37th, Baring, and 34th. Route 43 runs east on Spring Garden Street and west on Haverford Avenue. The neighborhood is adjacent to 30th Street Station, which serves all Northeast Corridor trains, the New Jersey Transit Atlantic City Line, and all Regional Rail lines, as well as the Market-Frankford Line and the subway-surface trolley lines.

Arts and Culture
Several art and photo galleries have opened along Lancaster Avenue from 36th to 40th. The Community Education Center, at 35th and Lancaster, holds various community events and gatherings. Spiral Q Puppet Theater is located on Spring Garden Street between 31st and 32nd Streets. Nearby destinations include The Bridge, a movie theater at 40th and Walnut; and the Philadelphia Zoo at 34th and Girard.

During Lancaster Avenue's "Second Fridays," shops and galleries are open later and often have various specials, and the event often features live music.

Education and Hospitality
Public education choices include the Samuel Powel Elementary School at 36th and Powelton, the Drew School at 37th and Lancaster, and University City High School at 36th and Filbert. The University of Pennsylvania and Drexel University have significant presences in the neighborhood, as well as in adjacent areas to the south.

To serve these two universities, several hotels are located nearby, including the Sheraton at 36th and Chestnut, and The Inn at Penn, located between 36th & 37th Sts. on Sansom St. In Powelton proper, there are several bed-and-breakfasts, including the Cornerstone at 33rd and Baring Sts..

References

Further reading

External links

Powelton Village Civic Association
Historical Map of Powelton Village
 Interactive Map of Powelton Village
Archived copy of "InfoResources West Philadelphia  (InfoR)" - Neighborhood: Powelton Village. Archived 2011-07-20. Retrieved 2015-03-29

 
Neighborhoods in Philadelphia
National Register of Historic Places in Philadelphia
Houses on the National Register of Historic Places in Philadelphia
Houses completed in 1902
Historic districts in Philadelphia
Houses in Philadelphia
Historic districts on the National Register of Historic Places in Pennsylvania